Hwang Jae-hun (born 25 November 1990) is a South Korean footballer who plays as full back for Daejeon Citizen in K League 2. He changed his name from Hwang Byung-in in September 2013.

Career
Hwang joined Gyoengnam FC before 2009 season starts.

References

External links 

1990 births
Living people
Association football fullbacks
South Korean footballers
Gyeongnam FC players
Gimcheon Sangmu FC players
Chungju Hummel FC players
Suwon FC players
Daejeon Hana Citizen FC players
K League 1 players
K League 2 players